Cain's Way is the third album by the Polish death metal band Hate. It was recorded at Serakos Studio in 2001. The album was released in Poland under Apocalypse Productions/Koch International in 2001.

Track listing

Personnel
 Hate
Adam "ATF Sinner" Buszko - guitars, vocals
Piotr "Kaos" Jeziorski - guitars
Cyprian Konador - bass guitar
Piotr "Mittloff" Kozieradzki - drums

 Production
 Robert Srzednicki - mixing, mastering, producer, engineering 
 Paweł "Blitz" Roslon - photos 
 
 Note
 Recorded at Serakos Studio, Warsaw 2001.

References

2003 albums